The plate-toothed giant hutia (Elasmodontomys obliquus) is an extinct species of rodent in the family Heptaxodontidae. It is the only species within the genus Elasmodontomys. It was found in Puerto Rico.

Despite being described as a "giant hutia", it has recently been recovered as a member of the Chinchilloidea.

References

Heptaxodontidae
Mammals of Puerto Rico
Endemic fauna of Puerto Rico
Extinct rodents
Extinct animals of North America
Rodents of North America
Holocene extinctions
Quaternary mammals of North America
Mammals described in 1916